Sławomir Szmal (born 2 October 1978) is a former Polish handball player, who played for the Poland men's national handball team, a participant in the Olympic Games Beijing 2008, and a medalist in the World Championship (silver in 2007, bronzes in 2009, 2015). Szmal is currently the goalkeeping coach of the Polish national team.

Career

National team
On 19 August 1998 he debuted for the national team in a match against Lithuania (31:20). On 4 February 2007 he won a silver medal at the World Championship, after losing the final match with Germany (24:29). For his sport achievements he received the Gold Cross of Merit in 2007.

He won a bronze medal at the 2009 World Championship. In 2009 Szmal was voted IHF World Player of the Year, while Igor Vori came 2nd and Nikola Karabatić came 3rd.

On 1 February 2015 Poland, including Szmal, won the bronze medal at the 2015 World Championship. They won the bronze medal match (29:28) against Spain.

Personal life
Szmal was born in Strzelce Opolskie, Poland. He is married to Aneta, who is a former handball player. They have a son named Filip.

Sporting achievements

State awards
 2007  Gold Cross of Merit
 2015  Knight's Cross of Polonia Restituta

References

External links
Polish Handball Association player profile
Vive Targi Kielce player profile

1978 births
Living people
People from Strzelce Opolskie
Sportspeople from Opole Voivodeship
Polish male handball players
Polish handball coaches
Olympic handball players of Poland
Handball players at the 2008 Summer Olympics
Handball players at the 2016 Summer Olympics
Rhein-Neckar Löwen players
Handball-Bundesliga players
Wisła Płock (handball) players
Vive Kielce players
Expatriate handball players
Polish expatriates in Germany